Marienlyst is an area in the borough of St. Hanshaugen in Oslo. It is best known as the site of the national headquarters of the Norwegian Broadcasting Corporation (NRK), and "Marienlyst" is often used synonymously with NRK.

It is located next to the University of Oslo at Blindern.

Architecture
The area is characterized by functionalist architecture, some of it is of outstanding quality.

Playgrounds
A large area of green fields and sports grounds is located in Marienlyst. There is a football field, a skateboard ramp and tennis courts. Marienlyst aktivitetspark og fritidsklubb provides activities for children and youth. The area is also used for old people and for parents taking their babies for a walk in the stroller.

Marienlyst manor
Marienlyst manor (Gård) dates from 1765 and is located Blindernveien 10. It is currently a public kindergarten.

Neighbourhoods of Oslo